The Hellenic Fire Service is the national agency of Greece for fire and rescue service. It is part of the Ministry for Citizen Protection.

History 

In 1833, with the establishment of the Greek Kingdom, the fire responsibility was given to the individual prefectures and municipalities. In 1854 a Firemen Company (Λόχος Πυροσβεστών) was formed in Athens, as part of the Greek Army, expanded in 1861 into a two-company mixed sapper and firemen formation (Διλοχία Σκαπανέων και Πυροσβεστών). It was not until 1914 that the corps, now again known as Firemen Company and still under military control, was expanded to other cities outside Athens, covering also Thessaloniki, Patras and Piraeus.

In 1926, the Fire Service was formed as a separate branch within the military, but proved ineffective, so that in 1929, a Greek émigré from Russia, the former head of St Petersburg Fire Service Alkiviadis Kokkinakis, was tasked with reforming the service. In 1930, the Fire Service was reconstituted as an independent national authority under the Ministry of the Interior. Until 1975 the chiefs of the service were transferred from the Gendarmerie or the Cities Police.

From 1998 the Fire Service has also the responsibility for forest fires, taking over from the Forestry Service.

Operation 

Its mission is to provide safety for the citizens and their property. It operates during fires, forest fires, car accidents, other natural or man-made disasters and during rescue operations. Other duties include the collaboration with the other Greek security forces, prevention measures and information and/or education of the public. The various legal and regulatory texts describing the organization and operation of the Fire Service were codified in 1992 in Presidential Decree 210.

Organization 

 The central body is located in Athens
 Regional Fire Services Administration
 Fire station of four grades (a,b,c,d) throughout the country
 Smaller fire stations, plus voluntary fire stations and voluntary 
 Special Units for disasters (EMAK)
 Special services:
 Firefighting Academy
 Coordinating Center (tel.199)
 General Warehouse Material
 Confrontation of arson crimes

Voluntary Corps 
In 1991, a new Voluntary Corps was formed for volunteers (today the 15% of the strength). Volunteers act as a support force and they have to be officially recognized and trained by the Greek state. The legal and regulatory framework for volunteers in the Hellenic Fire Service and the Hellenic Coast Guard was updated with Law 4029 in 2011.

Equipment 
Since the 1930s, the Fire Service has used more than 3,500 vehicles. Today it owns about 2,500 trucks and cars (1,500 fire engines and fire tenders, 800 auxiliary and 200 special), 44 firefighting aircraft, 20 helicopters (5 belonging to the House and 15 leased) and 10 firefighting vessels.

Training 
The training takes place at the Firefighting Academy which is located in Kato Kifissia with an annex at Villia Attikis. The first "Firefighting School" was established in 1936 at Sarri Street (an outpost of the 1st Fire Station) in Athens, while the Academy was established in 1968.

Ranks

Gallery

See also 
 Hellenic Police
 Hellenic Coast Guard
 List of fire departments

Notes and references

External links 
 http://www.fireservice.gr

 
Fire departments
Emergency services in Greece
1926 establishments in Greece